The Human Metabolome Database (HMDB) is a comprehensive, high-quality, freely accessible, online database of small molecule metabolites found in the human body. Created by the Human Metabolome Project funded  by Genome Canada. One of the first dedicated metabolomics databases, the HMDB facilitates human metabolomics research, including the identification and characterization of human metabolites using NMR spectroscopy, GC-MS spectrometry and LC/MS spectrometry.  To aid in this discovery process, the HMDB contains three kinds of data: 1) chemical data, 2) clinical data, and 3) molecular biology/biochemistry data (Fig. 1–3). The chemical data includes 41,514 metabolite structures with detailed descriptions along with nearly 10,000 NMR, GC-MS and LC/MS spectra.

The clinical data includes information on >10,000 metabolite-biofluid concentrations and metabolite concentration information on more than 600 different human diseases. The biochemical data includes 5,688 protein (and DNA) sequences and more than 5000 biochemical reactions that are linked to these metabolite entries. Each metabolite entry in the HMDB contains more than 110 data fields with 2/3 of the information being devoted to chemical/clinical data and the other 1/3 devoted to enzymatic or biochemical data. Many data fields are hyperlinked to other databases (KEGG, MetaCyc, PubChem, Protein Data Bank, ChEBI, Swiss-Prot, and GenBank) and a variety of structure and pathway viewing applets. The HMDB database supports extensive text, sequence, spectral, chemical structure and relational query searches. It has been widely used in metabolomics, clinical chemistry, biomarker discovery and general biochemistry education.

Four additional databases, DrugBank, T3DB, SMPDB  and FooDB are also part of the HMDB suite of databases. DrugBank contains equivalent information on ~1600 drug and drug metabolites, T3DB contains information on 3100 common toxins and environmental pollutants, SMPDB contains pathway diagrams for 700 human metabolic and disease pathways, while FooDB contains equivalent information on ~28,000 food components and food additives.

Version history
The first version of HMDB was released on January 1, 2007, followed by two subsequent versions on January 1, 2009 (version 2.0), August 1, 2009 (version 2.5), September 18, 2012 (version 3.0) and Jan. 1, 2013 (version 3.5), 2017 (version 4.0). Details for each of the major HMDB versions (up to version 4.0) is provided in Table 1.

Scope and access
All data in HMDB is non-proprietary or is derived from a non-proprietary source. It is freely accessible and available to anyone. In addition, nearly every data item is fully traceable and explicitly referenced to the original source. HMDB data is available through a public web interface and downloads.

See also
KEGG
DrugBank
SMPDB
MetaCyc
Bovine Metabolome Database
Metabolome
Metabolomics
List of biological databases

References

Metabolomic databases
Medical databases
Biological databases
Food databases
Human metabolites